This is a list of New York State Historic Markers by county.  There are over 2800 historical markers in New York State.  The program was started in 1926 to commemorate the Sesquicentennial of the Revolutionary War and was discontinued in 1966.  It was managed under the Department of the Education’s State History Office.



Numbers of markers
Approximate tallies of markers in New York and its 62 counties follow. The approximate counts are the best available; there may be additions to the listings that are not reflected here, and the counts here may not be perfectly updated.

References

External links

New York State Museum page on historic markers
Association of Public Historians of New York State page on historical markers
New York State Historical Markers on Flickr

 
Markers